Metán Viejo is a village and rural municipality in Salta Province in northwestern Argentina.

References 

Populated places in Salta Province